A packaging gas is used to pack sensitive materials such as food into a modified atmosphere environment. The gas used is usually inert, or of a nature that protects the integrity of the packaged goods, inhibiting unwanted chemical reactions such as food spoilage or oxidation. Some may also serve as a propellant for aerosol sprays like cans of whipped cream. For packaging food, the use of various gases is approved by regulatory organisations.

Their E numbers are included in the following lists in parentheses.

Inert gases
These gas types do not cause a chemical change to the substance that they protect.
 argon (E938), used for canned products
 helium (E939), used for canned products
 nitrogen (E941), also propellant
 carbon dioxide (E290), also propellant

Propellant gases
Specific kinds of packaging gases are aerosol propellants. These process and assist the ejection of the product from its container.
 chlorofluorocarbons known as CFC (E940 and E945), now rarely used because of the damage that they do to the ozone layer:
 dichlorodifluoromethane (E940)
 chloropentafluoroethane (E945)
 nitrous oxide (E942), used for aerosol whipped cream canisters (see Nitrous oxide: Aerosol propellant)
 octafluorocyclobutane (E946)

Reactive gases
These must be used with caution as they may have adverse effects when exposed to certain chemicals. They will cause oxidisation or contamination to certain types of materials.
 oxygen (E948), used e.g. for packaging of vegetables
 hydrogen (E949)

Volatile gases
Hydrocarbon gases approved for use with food need to be used with extreme caution as they are highly combustible, when combined with oxygen they burn very rapidly and may cause explosions in confined spaces. Special precautions must be taken when transporting these gases.
 butane (E943a)
 isobutane (E943b)
 propane (E944)

See also
 Shielding gas

References

Food additives
Food science
Hydrogen technologies
Packaging
Industrial gases